Josh A. Cagan is an actor and writer, best known as being a writer for the short lived animated series Undergrads.

Filmography

As actor
Undergrads (2001, as Rob Brody (8 episodes), Nerd 1, Nerd 2, Bobby Whiskey)
ScriptGirl Report: High-atus (2008, 1 episode, as guest host)
LearningTown (2013, 2 episodes, as Crew Member / Dumpster Dad)

As writer
Undergrads (2001, 6 episodes)
Kidz Bop: Everyone's a Star! (2003, video short)
Zoé Kézako (2004, 2 episodes, collaboration)
Linus (2008, short, written by)
Bandslam (2009, screenplay/story)
It Has Begun: Bananapocalypse (2012, short)
Shelf Life (2013, 1 episode)
The DUFF (2015, screenplay)
Spin (2021)

References

External links
 

Living people
Year of birth missing (living people)
American male actors